True Blue is a jazz album by saxophonist Dexter Gordon and saxophonist Al Cohn, recorded in 1976 for Xanadu Records.

Reception

Allmusic awarded the album 3½ stars with its review by Michael G. Nastos stating, "True Blue is led in title under the auspices of Dexter Gordon as a welcome home party conducted by Don Schlitten for the expatriate tenor saxophonist in 1976. Essentially a jam session, this very talented septet features a two tenor-two trumpet front line, utilized to emphasize the soloing strength of the horns, not necessarily in joyous shouts or big-band like unison outbursts.".

Track listing
"Lady Bird" (Tadd Dameron) - 10:59
"How Deep Is the Ocean?" (Irving Berlin) - 9:30 
"True Blue" (Blue Mitchell) - 17:38

Personnel 
 Al Cohn & Dexter Gordon - tenor saxophone
 Blue Mitchell, Sam Noto - trumpet
 Barry Harris - piano
 Sam Jones - bass
 Louis Hayes - drums

References

1976 albums
Xanadu Records albums
Dexter Gordon albums
Al Cohn albums
Albums produced by Don Schlitten